Disney Girlz Rock is a compilation of teen pop songs that have been used in Disney Channel and Disney-related productions. It includes some of the most popular female Disney artists and girl groups like The Cheetah Girls, as well as former Disney-turned-mainstream acts such as Hilary Duff, Aly & AJ, Lindsay Lohan and Raven-Symoné. The album was released on June 7, 2005. A follow-up to this album was released in 2008.

Track listing
"Can't Help Falling In Love" – A*Teens (from Lilo & Stitch)
"Ultimate" – Lindsay Lohan (from Freaky Friday)
"Together We Can" – The Cheetah Girls (from The Cheetah Girls)
"Our Lips Are Sealed" – Hilary Duff & Haylie Duff (from A Cinderella Story)*
"Superstition" – Raven-Symoné (from The Haunted Mansion)
"Reach" – Caleigh Peters (from Ice Princess)
"Drama Queen (That Girl)"  – Lindsay Lohan (from Confessions of a Teenage Drama Queen)
"Go Figure" – Everlife (from Go Figure)
"Rush" – Aly & AJ (from Twitches)
"Anytime You Need a Friend" – The Beu Sisters (from Home on the Range)
"This is My Time" – Raven-Symoné (from The Princess Diaries 2: Royal Engagement)
"I Fly" – Hayden Panettiere (from Ice Princess)
"Let's Bounce" – Christy Carlson Romano (The Princess Diaries 2: Royal Engagement)
"Reflection" – Christina Aguilera (from Mulan)
"Miracles Happen (When You Believe)" – Myra (from The Princess Diaries)

* Although A Cinderella Story was released by Warner Bros. Pictures, the film's soundtrack was released by Disney's Hollywood Records.

References

2005 compilation albums
Pop compilation albums
Teen pop compilation albums
Walt Disney Records compilation albums
Disney Channel albums